Pine Canyon, also known as Lincoln, is a township and unincorporated community in Tooele County, Utah, United States. It was established in 1876 at the mouth of Pine Canyon, which is what gave the community its name. A post office was also established in the town.

References

Populated places established in 1876
Unincorporated communities in Tooele County, Utah
Unincorporated communities in Utah
1876 establishments in Utah Territory